Simon James Jupp (born 8 September 1985) is a British Conservative Party politician who was elected as Member of Parliament (MP) for East Devon at the 2019 general election.

Early life and career
Jupp was born in Plymouth at Freedom Fields Hospital in 1985. As a teenager, he volunteered at a local radio station on weekends. After college, he worked as a presenter for commercial radio stations in Devon, later becoming a journalist and manager for the BBC and ITV, before entering politics.

Political career
Jupp joined the Conservative Campaign Headquarters press office as the Head of Broadcast in 2017. He was appointed as Special Advisor to Tim Bowles, the Mayor of the West of England in 2018. In 2019, he joined the Foreign and Commonwealth Office as a Special Advisor to the First Secretary of State and Foreign Secretary Dominic Raab.

Jupp was selected to replace Sir Hugo Swire as the Conservative candidate for East Devon in November 2019 and won the seat with 50.8% of the vote and a majority of 6,708. Jupp was elected by MPs to be a member of the Transport Select Committee in February 2020 and the Digital, Culture, Media and Sport Committee in September 2021.

References

External links

Living people
UK MPs 2019–present
Conservative Party (UK) MPs for English constituencies
Members of the Parliament of the United Kingdom for East Devon
Politicians from Plymouth, Devon
British special advisers
1985 births